was a professional wrestling event promoted by World Wonder Ring Stardom. It took place on December 29, 2021, with a limited attendance due in part to the ongoing COVID-19 pandemic at the time. The event marked the last pay-per-view of 2021 hosted by the promotion. The preshow matches were broadcast on Stardom's YouTube channel.

Storylines
The show featured eight professional wrestling matches that resulted from scripted storylines, where wrestlers portrayed villains, heroes, or less distinguishable characters in the scripted events that built tension and culminated in a wrestling match or series of matches. On December 4, 2021, Konami announced she will be taking a hiatus from professional wrestling to attend her personal well being. Giulia immediately stepped up to challenge her for a match on December 29 which she accepted.

Event
The show started with the five-way match between Lady C, Saki Kashima, Rina, Waka Tsukiyama and Fukigen Death won by the latter. Next was Stars unit member Hanan who defeated Ruaka to win the Future of Stardom Championship at 17 years of age, becoming the eight wrestler to ever hold the title. The event also portraited the fight between MaiHimePoi (Maika, Natsupoi and Himeka) and Cosmic Angels' Unagi Sayaka, Mina Shirakawa and Mai Sakurai who challenged Dona Del Mondo's subgroup back at Osaka Super Wars. MaiHimePoi succeeded in defending for the fourth time in a row. Starlight Kid successfully defended her High Speed Championship in a three-way match against AZM and Koguma. The confrontation between Giulia and Konami who saw the half-italian superstar picking up the win against Stardom's sleeper represented Konami's last match before taking a planned hiatus from professional wrestling to deal with lingering injuries. Both Konami and Giulia wore Tokyo Cyber Squad style attires to pay tribute to the late Hana Kimura and to Konami's former unit. Giulia had a flag that said “Never End” which was an alternate of Konami's catchphrase "The End".

Results

Notes

References

External links
Page Stardom World

2021 in professional wrestling
Women's professional wrestling shows
World Wonder Ring Stardom shows
World Wonder Ring Stardom
Professional wrestling in Tokyo